California Proposition 68 (also the Natural Resources Bond or the California Drought, Water, Parks, Climate, Coastal Protection, and Outdoor Access for All Act of 2018) was a legislatively referred constitutional amendment that appeared on ballots in California in the June primary election in 2018. It was a $4.1bn bond measure to fund parks, environmental projects, water infrastructure projects and flood protection measures throughout California.

Proposal
The Proposition would allow the State of California to borrow $4.1bn using a municipal bond scheme in order to fund parks, water and flood protection infrastructure and various environmental projects. The Proposition set allocation of these funds between different strategies:
Natural Resource Conservation and Resiliency - $1.547bn
State conservancies and wildlife conservation - $767m
Climate preparedness and habitat resiliency - $443m
Ocean and coastal protection - $175m
River and waterway improvements - $162m
Parks and recreation - $1.283bn
Parks in neighbourhoods with few parks - $725m
Local and regional parks - $285m
State park restoration, preservation and protection - $218m
Trails, greenways, and rural recreation - $55m
Water - $1.27bn
Flood protection - $550m
Groundwater recharge and cleanup - $370m
Safe drinking water - $250m
Water recycling - $100m

The cost to the public was estimated to be $7.8bn after paying off interest, or an average annual repayment of $200m for forty years.

Campaign

Support 
Proposition 68 was authored by State Senator Kevin de León. The 'Yes' campaign focused mainly on the improvements the Proposition would bring to parks, saying that it would remedy years of "under-investment" in environmental infrastructure in poorer communities. 'Yes' supporters spent more than $9m throughout the campaign.

Endorsements
Jerry Brown, then-Governor of California
Gavin Newsom, then-Lieutenant Governor of California
Antonio Villaraigosa, former Los Angeles mayor
League of California Cities, association of California's cities
Los Angeles Times, the United States' fifth largest newspaper, based in Los Angeles
The Sacramento Bee, Sacramento's largest newspaper
Daily Bruin, University of California, Los Angeles newspaper
The Mercury News, paper from San Jose, California
The Outdoor Industry Association
Save the Redwoods League
Peninsula Open Space Trust

Opposition 
Opposition to Proposition 68 mainly argued that instead of issuing debt, the state should fund parks and environmental projects through California's general fund. It was also noted that although the 'Yes' campaign was promoting the Proposition on its benefits to parks, less than one third of the money would actually go towards parks and recreation.

Endorsements
John Moorlach, State Senator
Andrea Seastrand, former House member
Jon Coupal, President of the Howard Jarvis Taxpayers Association
Peace and Freedom Party, left-wing political party
Chico Enterprise-Record, newspaper of Chico, California

Results

Yes/No Statement 
A "yes" vote on Proposition 68 proposes: The state could sell $4.1 billion in general obligation bonds to fund various natural resources-related programs such as for habitat conservation, parks, and water-related projects. A "no" vote on Proposition 68 proposes: The state could not sell $4.1 billion in general obligation bonds to fund various natural resources-related programs.

Results
Proposition 68 gained 3,808,000 yes votes and 2,831,899 no votes (a total of 6,639,899 votes), so passing with 57.35% approval

References

2018 California elections
2018 California ballot propositions
Environment of California
Parks in California